The Manistee Pierhead lights are a pair of active aids to navigation located on the north and south pier in the harbor of Manistee, Michigan, "Lake Michigan’s Victorian Port City."

History
The first light was on the south pier in 1870. Unfortunately, it burnt in the Great fire of 1871, October 8, 1871, along with the town of Manistee.  Coincidentally, Manistee burnt on the same day as the Great Chicago Fire, Peshtigo Fire in Wisconsin, and fires in Port Huron and Holland, Michigan.

Two lighthouses were built, one on each pier in 1875. Over the years the lights have been moved several times, including moves to and from the mainland, and to and from the south to the north pier. Lights have been torn down and rebuilt.

The current tower is located on the north pier. It is constructed of cast iron, and was first listed in 1927. The tower is a white cylinder, and the keepers house is separate. The original lens was a Fifth Order Fresnel lens. The tower has also been rebuilt as the pier has been extended. Other changes have involved the placement and configuration of the fog horn. The catwalk is one of only four that survive in the State of Michigan. National Register of Historic Places, Reference # 90000718  The tower is capped with a ten-sided steel lantern. The light uses a 5,000 candlepower incandescent electric bulb, and has a flashing mechanism which displays "a group occulting white light" over 30 seconds. The "Type C" diaphone is powered by an electric compressor housed in the tower, and emits a group of three blasts every 30 seconds. There is also a radio beacon.

The northern pier light is located on the same side of the river as the Manistee Coast Guard station, and within shouting distance of the Manistee South pier light.

The south pier has a  steel tower navigational aid.  This was constructed when the lighthouse was moved to the north pier in 1927.

Manistee Pierhead Light was put up for sale under the National Historic Lighthouse Preservation Act in 2009. On June 30, 2011, ownership of the light was transferred to the City of Manistee. The Manistee County Historical Museum will maintain the light.

Directions

Beach and Park.

See also
Lighthouses in the United States

Notes

Further reading

 Bibliography on Michigan lighthouses.
 Crompton, Samuel Willard  & Michael J. Rhein, The Ultimate Book of Lighthouses (2002) ; .
 Hyde, Charles K., and Ann and John Mahan. The Northern Lights: Lighthouses of the Upper Great Lakes.  Detroit: Wayne State University Press, 1995.    .
 Jones, Ray & Bruce Roberts, American Lighthouses (Globe Pequot, September 1, 1998, 1st Ed.) ; .
 Jones, Ray,The Lighthouse Encyclopedia, The Definitive Reference (Globe Pequot, January 1, 2004, 1st ed.) ; .
Lynn, Bruce. "A Light is on in the Graveyard [Whitefish Point]." Lighthouse Digest (Aug 1997), pp. 1–3.
 Noble, Dennis, Lighthouses & Keepers: U. S. Lighthouse Service and Its Legacy (Annapolis: U. S. Naval Institute Press, 1997). ; .
 Oleszewski, Wes, Great Lakes Lighthouses, American and Canadian: A Comprehensive Directory/Guide to Great Lakes Lighthouses, (Gwinn, Michigan: Avery Color Studios, Inc., 1998) .
 Penrod, John, Lighthouses of Michigan, (Berrien Center, Michigan: Penrod/Hiawatha, 1998)  .
 
 Putnam, George R., Lighthouses and Lightships of the United States, (Boston: Houghton Mifflin Co., 1933).
 United States Coast Guard, Aids to Navigation, (Washington, DC: U. S. Government Printing Office, 1945).
 
 
 Wagner, John L., Michigan Lighthouses: An Aerial Photographic Perspective, (East Lansing, Michigan: John L. Wagner, 1998)  .
 Wright, Larry and Wright, Patricia, Great Lakes Lighthouses Encyclopedia Hardback (Erin: Boston Mills Press, 2006) .

External links

 Live Webcam Feed, Manistee North Pierhead Lighthouse, from Manistee Surf Cam.
 Aerial photos, Manistee North Pierhead Light, marinas.com.
 Detroit News, Interactive map on Michigan lighthouses.

Lighthouses completed in 1870
Lighthouses completed in 1927
Buildings and structures in Manistee County, Michigan
Lighthouses on the National Register of Historic Places in Michigan
Tourist attractions in Manistee County, Michigan
Transportation in Manistee County, Michigan
National Register of Historic Places in Manistee County, Michigan